

About the Award
The Lifetime Achievement Award is presented to an individual who has made numerous contributions to the entertainment industry.

References

External links
 NAACP Theatre Awards

African-American theatre
NAACP Theatre Awards
Awards established in 1991
Lifetime achievement awards
1991 establishments in the United States